Roberto Airoldi (born 19 January 1976) is an Italian Paralympic archer.

In the 2016 Summer Paralympics, his debut games, Airoldi won his first Paralympic medal which was bronze.

His hobbies are motorbiking, rugby and trekking.

References

External links
 

Paralympic archers of Italy
Archers at the 2016 Summer Paralympics
Paralympic silver medalists for Italy
Living people
Italian male archers
1976 births
Italian motorcycle racers
Medalists at the 2016 Summer Paralympics
Paralympic medalists in archery
21st-century Italian people